WAS/WASL-interacting protein family member 2 is a protein that in humans is encoded by the WIPF2 gene.

This gene encodes a WASP interacting protein (WIP)-related protein. It has been shown that this protein has a role in the WASP-mediated organization of the actin cytoskeleton and that this protein is a potential link between the activated platelet-derived growth factor receptor and the actin polymerization machinery.

References

Further reading